West Compton can refer to:

West Compton, California, USA
West Compton, Dorset, England
West Compton, Somerset, England